Everton is a small town located  from Wangaratta in northeast Victoria, along the Great Alpine Road.

Attractions of the town and area include the Murray to the Mountains Rail Trail (a sealed off-road bicycle path offering  of cycling along former railway tracks), wineries, and the Victorian High Country.

Everton Post Office opened in 1876 and closed in 1965. An earlier Everton office opened on 8 May 1873, was renamed Everton Station in 1876, Everton Rail around 1909, Everton Upper in 1922 and also closed in 1965.

References

External links

Australian Places - Everton

Towns in Victoria (Australia)
Rural City of Wangaratta